The field of psychology has been greatly influenced by the study of genetics. Decades of research have demonstrated that both genetic and environmental factors play a role in a variety of behaviors in humans and animals (e.g. Grigorenko & Sternberg, 2003). The genetic basis of aggression, however, remains poorly understood. Aggression is a multi-dimensional concept, but it can be generally defined as behavior that inflicts pain or harm on another.

Genetic-developmental theory states that individual differences in a continuous phenotype result from the action of a large number of genes, each exerting an effect that works with environmental factors to produce the trait. This type of trait is influenced by multiple factors making it more complex and difficult to study than a simple Mendelian trait (one gene for one phenotype).

History
Past thought on genetic factors influencing aggression, specifically in regard to sex chromosomes, tended to seek answers from chromosomal abnormalities. Four decades ago, the XYY genotype was (erroneously) believed by many to be correlated with aggression. In 1965 and 1966, researchers at the MRC Clinical & Population Cytogenetics Research Unit led by Dr. Court Brown at Western General Hospital in Edinburgh reported finding a much higher than expected nine XYY men (2.9%) averaging almost 6 ft. tall in a survey of 314 patients at the State Hospital for Scotland; seven of the nine XYY patients were mentally retarded. In their initial reports published before examining the XYY patients, the researchers suggested they might have been hospitalized because of aggressive behavior. When the XYY patients were examined, the researchers found their assumptions of aggressive behavior were incorrect. Unfortunately, many science and medicine textbooks quickly and uncritically incorporated the initial, incorrect assumptions about XYY and aggression—including psychology textbooks on aggression.

The XYY genotype first gained wide notoriety in 1968 when it was raised as a part of a defense in two murder trials in Australia and France. In the United States, five attempts to use the XYY genotype as a defense were unsuccessful—in only one case in 1969 was it allowed to go to a jury—which rejected it.

Results from several decades of long-term follow-up of scores of unselected XYY males identified in eight international newborn chromosome screening studies in the 1960s and 1970s have replaced pioneering but biased studies from the 1960s (that used only institutionalized XYY men), as the basis for current understanding of the XYY genotype and established that XYY males are characterized by increased height but are not characterized by aggressive behavior. Though the link currently between genetics and aggression has turned to an aspect of genetics different from chromosomal abnormalities, it is important to understand where the research started and the direction it is moving towards today.

Heritability

Research methods
As with other topics in behavioral genetics, aggression is studied in three main experimental ways to help identify what role genetics plays in the behavior:
 Heritability studies – studies focused to determine whether a trait, such as aggression, is heritable and how it is inherited from parent to offspring. These studies make use of genetic linkage maps to identify genes associated with certain behaviors such as aggression.
 Mechanism experiments – studies to determine the biological mechanisms that lead certain genes to influence types of behavior like aggression.
 Genetic behavior correlation studies – studies that use scientific data and attempt to correlate it with actual human behavior. Examples include twin studies and adoption studies.

These three main experimental types are used in animal studies, studies testing heritability and molecular genetics, and gene/environment interaction studies. Recently, important links between aggression and genetics have been studied and the results are allowing scientists to better understand the connections.

Selective breeding
The heritability of aggression has been observed in many animal strains after noting that some strains of birds, dogs, fish, and mice seem to be more aggressive than other strains. Selective breeding has demonstrated that it is possible to select for genes that lead to more aggressive behavior in animals. Selective breeding examples also allow researchers to understand the importance of developmental timing for genetic influences on aggressive behavior. A study done in 1983 (Cairns) produced both highly aggressive male and female strains of mice dependent on certain developmental periods to have this more aggressive behavior expressed. These mice were not observed to be more aggressive during the early and later stages of their lives, but during certain periods of time (in their middle-age period) were more violent and aggressive in their attacks on other mice. Selective breeding is a quick way to select for specific traits and see those selected traits within a few generations of breeding. These characteristics make selective breeding an important tool in the study of genetics and aggressive behavior.

Mouse studies
Mice are often used as a model for human genetic behavior since mice and humans have homologous genes coding for homologous proteins that are used for similar functions at some biological levels. Mice aggression studies have led to some interesting insight in human aggression. Using reverse genetics, the DNA of genes for the receptors of many neurotransmitters have been cloned and sequenced, and the role of neurotransmitters in rodent aggression has been investigated using pharmacological manipulations. Serotonin has been identified in the offensive attack by male mice against intruder male mice. Mutants were made by manipulating a receptor for serotonin by deleting a gene for the serotonin receptor. These mutant male mice with the knockout alleles exhibited normal behavior in everyday activities such as eating and exploration, but when prompted, attacked intruders with twice the intensity of normal male mice. In offense aggression in mice, males with the same or similar genotypes were more likely to fight than males that encountered males of other genotypes. Another interesting finding in mice dealt with mice reared alone. These mice showed a strong tendency to attack other male mice upon their first exposure to the other animals. The mice reared alone were not taught to be more aggressive; they simply exhibited the behavior. This implicates the natural tendency related to biological aggression in mice since the mice reared alone lacked a parent to model aggressive behavior.

Oxidative stress arises as a result of excess production of reactive oxygen species in relation to defense mechanisms, including the action of antioxidants such as superoxide dismutase 1 (SOD1).  Knockout of the Sod1 gene was experimentally introduced in male mice leading to impaired antioxidant defense.  These mice were designated (Sod1-/-).   The Sod1-/- male mice proved to be more aggressive than both heterozygous knockout males (Sod1+/-) that were 50% deficient in SOD1, and wild-type males (Sod1+/+).  The basis for the association of oxidative stress with increased aggression has not yet been determined.

Biological mechanisms
Experiments designed to study biological mechanisms are utilized when exploring how aggression is influenced by genetics. Molecular genetics studies allow many different types of behavioral traits to be examined by manipulating genes and studying the effect(s) of the manipulation.

Molecular genetics
A number of molecular genetics studies have focused on manipulating candidate aggression genes in mice and other animals to induce effects that can be possibly applied to humans. Most studies have focused on polymorphisms of serotonin receptors, dopamine receptors, and neurotransmitter metabolizing enzymes. Results of these studies have led to linkage analysis to map the serotonin-related genes and impulsive aggression, as well as dopamin-related genes and proactive aggression. In particular, the serotonin 5-HT seems to be an influence in inter-male aggression either directly or through other molecules that use the 5-HT pathway. 5-HT normally dampens aggression in animals and humans. Mice missing specific genes for 5-HT were observed to be more aggressive than normal mice and were more rapid and violent in their attacks. Other studies have been focused on neurotransmitters. Studies of a mutation in the neurotransmitter metabolizing enzyme monoamine oxidase A (MAO-A) have been shown to cause a syndrome that includes violence and impulsivity in humans. Studies of the molecular genetics pathways are leading to the production of pharmaceuticals to fix the pathway problems and hopefully show an observed change in aggressive behavior.

Human behavior genetics
In determining if a trait is related to genetic factors or environmental factors, twin studies and adoption studies are used. These studies examine correlations based on similarity of a trait and a person's genetic or environmental factors that could influence the trait. Aggression has been examined via both twin studies and adoption studies.

Twin studies
Twin studies are studies typically conducted comparing identical and fraternal twins. They aim to reveal the importance of environmental and genetic influences for traits, phenotypes, and disorders. Before the advancement of molecular genetics, twin studies were almost the only mode of investigation of genetic influences on personality. Heritability was estimated as twice the difference between the correlation for identical, or monozygotic, twins and that for fraternal, or dizygotic, twins. Early studies indicated that personality was fifty percent genetic. Current thinking holds that each individual picks and chooses from a range of stimuli and events largely on the basis of his genotype creating a unique set of experiences; basically meaning that people create their own environments.

See also
 Anthropological criminology
 Behavioural genetics

Notes

References
 Grigorenko, E.L. & Sternberg, R.J. (2003). The nature nurture issue. In A. Slater & G. Bremner (Eds.), An introduction to developmental psychology. Malden, MA: Blackwell.
 Pomp, D. (2010). Genomic mapping of social behavior traits in a F2 cross derived from mice selectively bred for high aggression. BCM Genetics, 11:113. doi:10.1186/1471-2156-11-113

Aggression
Animal genetics
Forensic psychology
Criminology
Behavioural sciences
Behavioral neuroscience
Behavioural genetics